Masthouse Terrace Pier is a pier on the River Thames on the Isle of Dogs in London, England. It is located at the end of Napier Avenue, off Westferry Road, at the southern end of the Isle of Dogs, and provides river bus services managed by London River Services.

Services
Masthouse Terrace is a stop on the Thames commuter catamaran service run by Thames Clippers from Embankment, via Tower Millennium Pier, Canary Wharf and on to Greenwich, the O2 and Woolwich Arsenal Pier.

Masthouse Terrace Pier temporarily closed between 14 January 2008 and 26 April 2008 for renovation work carried out by British Waterways, at a cost of £500,000. Transport for London provided a grant of £400,000 towards this work. The refurbishment work included installation of CCTV, a new waiting shelter, maintenance and repainting work.

Connections
London Buses routes 277 and D7

References

London River Services
Transport in the London Borough of Tower Hamlets
Piers in London
Millwall